Lydia Jane Lipscombe  (born 9 October 1979) is a former New Zealand female swimmer. She competed in the women's 100 m, 200 m, and 4 × 100 m backstroke events at the 1996 Summer Olympics.

References

External links 

1979 births
Living people
Swimmers from Christchurch
Olympic swimmers of New Zealand
New Zealand female swimmers
Swimmers at the 1996 Summer Olympics